Calypogeia suecica is a species of liverwort belonging to the family Calypogeiaceae.

It is native to Europe and Northern America.

References

Calypogeiaceae